Jorabat is a village, suburban fringe and a junction which covers area under both Ri-Bhoi district, Meghalaya, India and Kamrup Metropolitan district, Assam, India, with greater parts in Kamrup Metropolitan district of Assam and lesser southern parts in Ri-Bhoi district of Meghalaya.

Geography
The area is sandwiched between southern Brahmaputra Valley and northern parts of East Khasi Hills.

Ethnic groups
Though the area mostly lies in Kamrup (Metropolitan) district of Assam, being a transportation hub area is a conglomeration of communities living in harmony and peace which is hard to find in the rest of North east India where hostilities between various ethnic and religious group is a common scenario. The occupation of majority of the people living in Jorabat is business. The Nepalese and Bihari community constitute a majority in the area whereas Assamese, Khasi, Bengali, Punjabi, Garo, Missing, Bodo, Adivashis (Tea Tribe), Bishnupriyas, Rajasthanis and religious minorities makes a combined sizable part of demography.

Places of interest and importance
Shri Shri Bhadrakaleshwari Mandir
Friday weekly bazaar
Jorabat Electricity Bill collection centre (Government of Assam)
Jorabat Telephone Exchange
North East Cancer Hospital

Transport
National Highway 40 links Jorabat to Jowai via Shillong and National Highway 37 passes through Jorabat and connects parts of East Assam with Guwahati.

References

Villages in Kamrup Metropolitan district
Villages in Ri-Bhoi district